An attack on the German railway communication system led to a disruption of the complete railway traffic in Northern Germany on 8 October 2022.

Event
In the early morning of 8 October 2022, two fibre optic cables which are necessary for the GSM-R communication system of Deutsche Bahn were deliberately damaged. The cut of the cables halted all rail traffic in northern Germany for around three hours. Services were affected between Berlin and regions in the west and north of the country including Schleswig-Holstein, the cities of Hamburg and Bremen, as well as Lower Saxony and parts of North Rhine-Westphalia.

The Berlin–Amsterdam route was also suspended, and thousands of travellers were stranded at stations across the affected regions. The Landespolizei of Berlin and North Rhine-Westphalia took over the crime investigation. On 13 October, the German general public persecutor and the German federal Criminal Police Office took over the investigations.

Cause
The severing of cables was highly "professional", it was "a targeted and professional attack on the railroads", Andreas Rosskopf, the chairman of the main police union, told to German media. The German Transport Minister Volker Wissing also said that essential cables "were deliberately and intentionally severed".

Impact
The attack raised concerns about the vulnerability of German infrastructure, especially taken into account the recent explosions on the Nord Stream gas pipelines and the German support for Ukraine in the Russian-Ukrainian War. The German main police union sees further sabotage at Deutsche Bahn as a possibility and called for surveillance systems to be strengthened. Green politician Anton Hofreiter told FUNKE media group that the sabotage reminded him of the disruption of the Nord Stream pipelines where the "trail leads to the Kremlin". "Maybe both were warning shots because we support Ukraine", Hofreiter added.   Meanwhile, German police stated that there was no sign of any involvement by a foreign state or terrorism, but did not exclude political motives in general.

References

Unsolved crimes in Europe
October 2022 events in Germany
Railway accidents and incidents in Germany